Bebedero River is a river of Costa Rica.

Fauna 
Bebedero river's fauna consists of the boat billed night heron, American crocodile, green iguana, little blue heron juvenile, little blue heron and howler monkeys.

References

Rivers of Costa Rica